Shillito is a surname. Notable people with the surname include:
 DM Ashura (born William James Robert Shillito, 1986–), American electronic musician
 Alan Shillito, British rugby league player
 John Shillito (1809–1879), American businessperson, founder of the John Shillito Company
 Lisa-Marie Shillito, British archaeologist

See also
 George Farquhar (priest), born George Taylor Shillito Farquhar, British Anglican priest